This Is Jean Shepard is the debut compilation album by American country artist Jean Shepard. The album was released in September 1959 on Capitol Records and was produced by Ken Nelson. The album included a series of Shepard's hits between 1953 and 1957.

Background and content 
This Is Jean Shepard consisted of twelve tracks of material Shepard had released either as singles or as B-sides for the Capitol label. The album's material comes from eight separate recording sessions. The first recording session began in September 1952 and two separate sessions in 1952. This is followed by three recording sessions that took place in 1955 and then two that took place in 1956. This Is Jean Shepard contained two of Shepard's Top 10 hits from 1955, which were "A Satisfied Mind" and "Beautiful Lies". It also included Shepard's debut single entitled "Crying Steel Guitar Waltz". It also features her 1956 singles "I Learned It All from You" and "You're Calling Me Sweetheart Again". Dan Cooper praised Shepard's vocal ability, stating, "One of her earlier LPs is strong on her voice and steel-friendly West Coast production. It includes her spry, proto-feminist "Two Whoops and a Holler." It also includes other well-known songs by Shepard such as "Act Like a Married Man" and "I'd Rather Die Young".

Release 
This Is Jean Shepard was released in September 1959 on the Capitol label. The album did not spawn any singles upon its release and did not chart any lists by Billboard Magazine. The album was originally issued on a 12-inch LP record and contained six songs on each side of the record. The singles that were initially release prior to the album were "Crying Steel Guitar Waltz", "Beautiful Lies", "A Satisfied Mind", "I Learned It All from You", "The Other Woman", and "Act Like a Married Man". The album received four and a half out of five stars by Allmusic's Dan Cooper, who called Shepard's vocals on the release to be "strong". The album has not been reissued on compact disc since its original release in 1959.

Track listing 
Side one
"A Satisfied Mind" – (Red Hayes, Jack Rhodes)
"Two Whoops and a Holler" – (Joe Franklin)
"I'd Rather Die Young" – (Beasley Smith, Billy Vaughn, Randy Wood)
"Why Did You Wait" – (Betty Westergard, Clyde Wilson)
"The Other Woman" – (Beverly Small)
"Act Like a Married Man" – (Jim Odom)

Side two
"Beautiful Lies" – (Rhodes)
"You're Calling Me Sweetheart Again" – (Gertrude Cox, Rhodes)
"Under Suspicion" – (Ira Kosloff, Ben Raleigh)
"Crying Steel Guitar Waltz" – (Susan Heather, Dolly Long, Shorty Long)
"My Wedding Ring" – (Rhodes)
"I Learned It All from You" – (Tommy Collins)

Personnel 
 Gene Breeden – steel guitar
 Jimmy Bryant – guitar
 John Cuivello – drums
 Bud Dooley – bass
 Alfred Kern – drums
 Clarence Lee – bass
 Billy Liebert – piano
 Red Murrell – bass
 Roy Nichols – guitar
 Fuzzy Owen – guitar
 Buck Owens – guitar
 Jerry Sanders – fiddle
 Jean Shepard – lead vocals
 Billy Strange – guitar
 Cliffie Stone – bass
 Lewis Talley – guitar
 Speedy West – steel guitar
 Bill Woods – piano

References 

Jean Shepard albums
Albums produced by Ken Nelson (United States record producer)
1959 compilation albums
Capitol Records compilation albums